The KSE-100 Index is a stock index acting as a benchmark to compare prices on the Pakistan Stock Exchange (PSX) over a period.

In determining representative companies to compute the index on, companies with the highest market capitalization are selected. However, to ensure full market representation, the company with the highest market capitalization from each sector is also included.

History

1991-2006 (Steady growth)
The index was launched in November 1991 with a base of 1,000 points. By February 2007, it had skyrocketed to 12,285 points.

2007 (Record breaking growth)
KSE-100 index touched the highest ever benchmark of 14,814 points on December 26, 2007, a day before the assassination of former Prime Minister Benazir Bhutto, when the index nosedived.

2008 Global crisis
April 20 : Karachi Stock Exchange achieved a major milestone when KSE-100 Index crossed the psychological level of 15,000 for the first time in its history and peaked 15,737.32 on 20 April 2008. Moreover, the increase of 7.4 per cent in 2008 made it the best performer among major emerging markets.
 May 23: Record high inflation in the month of May, 2008 resulted in the unexpected increase in the interest rates by State Bank of Pakistan which eventually resulted in sharp fall in Karachi Stock Exchange.
 July 17 :Angry investors attacked the Karachi Stock Exchange in protest at plunging Pakistani share prices.
 July 16 : KSE-100 Index dropped one-third from an all-time high hit in April, 2008 as rising pressure on shaky Pakistan's coalition government to tackle Taliban militants exacerbates concern about the country's economic woes.
 August 18: KSE 100 Index rose more than 4% after the announcement of the resignation of  President Pervez Musharraf but Credit Suisse Group said that Pakistan's Post-Musharraf rally in Stock Exchange will be short-lived because of a rising fiscal deficit and runaway inflation.
 August 28 :Karachi Stock Exchange set a floor for stock prices to halt a plunge that has wiped out $36.9 billion of market value since April.
 December 15: Trading resumes after the removal of floor on stock prices that was set on August 28 to halt sharp falls.

2009-2010 (Recovery started)
The recovery was started.

2011-2012 (Best emerging market)
As at 7 November 2012 index recorded highest level of 16,218 points and now KSE is being considered as a best emerging market in Asia with returns in financial 2011-2012 up to 40%-50%.

2013-2014 (Post-Elections)
As of  April the 30th KSE-100 Index recorded a new increase in its value standing at 28,913 points, that is more than 45.2% since the last fiscal year of 2012-2013.

2016 (Reaching new heights)
By the month of June, KSE-100 was in positive conditions and it achieved 38,777 points on 17 June 2016.

2017 (All-time high)
In January 2017, the stock market hit the all-time high of 49,969 points. On 13 February, it stands at 49,876 points.

Pakistan qualified for the popular MSCI Emerging Markets Index in May 2017, an upgrade from Morgan Stanley Capital International's (MSCI) Frontier Market (FM) index.

On May 25, 2017, the KSE-100 index reached the all-time high of 53,124 points, later it tanked to 37,919 points in a matter of seven months.

Following Britain's decision to leave EU on 24 June, KSE dropped 1,100 points (3.1 percent) as stock markets went in turmoil as investors sought safe havens like gold and government bonds.

2020 (COVID-19) 
First case of COVID-19 in Pakistan was reported on 26 Feb 2020. Its impact resulted in the fall of around 62% of KSE-100 index, lowest at 27,200 on March 25, 2020 from the high of 43,218 points on January 13, 2020. Despite the fall greater than 2005 and 2008 crisis, The market remained calm and confident, and no investors have made accusations of market manipulations and unfair trading.

Annual Returns 
The following table shows the annual development of the KSE 100 Index, which was calculated back to 2001.

Market indices
KSE began with a 50 shares index. As the market grew, a representative index was needed. On November 1, 1991, the KSE-100 was introduced and remains to this date the most generally accepted measure of the Exchange. The KSE-100 is a capitalization-weighted index and consists of 100 companies representing about 90 percent of market capitalization of the Exchange.

In 1995, the need was felt for an all share index to reconfirm the KSE-100 and also to provide the basis of index trading in future. On August 29, 1995, the KSE all share index was constructed and introduced on September 18, 1995.

The KSE 100 index reached its highest ever 53,103 points in May, 2017.

See also
 KSE-30 Index
KMI-30 Index
CDC

References

External links
Bloomberg page for KSE100:IND
 Official Website
 BBC Market Data: KSE-100
Reuters page for .KSE

Lists of companies of Pakistan
Pakistani stock market indices
Pakistan Stock Exchange
Investment